Areti is a community in the municipal unit of Lechaina, Elis, Greece. It is situated in a flat, rural area, south of the Kotychi lagoon. It is 1 km west of Kourtesi and 5 km northeast of Lechaina.
The Greek National Road 9/E55 (Patras - Pyrgos) and the railway Patras - Pyrgos pass south of the village. The site of ancient Myrsinus (known as Myrtuntium in later times) is located near Areti.

Population

See also

List of settlements in Elis

External links
GTP - Areti
GTP - Ancient Myrsini

See also

Arete
List of settlements in Elis

References 

Lechaina
Populated places in Elis